is a private university in Kyoto, Japan. 

It was founded as a school for Buddhist priests of the Nishi Hongan-ji denomination in 1639, and became a secularized university in 1876. The university's professors and students founded the literary magazine Chūōkōron in 1887. It has three campuses: Fukakusa and Omiya in Kyoto; and Seta in Shiga prefecture. Its campuses are smoke-free.It is one university belongs to "Sankinkoryu"(産近甲龍), a group of semi-major private universities in the Kansai area.

Faculties 
Faculty of LettersFaculty of EconomicsFaculty of Business AdministrationFaculty of LawFaculty of International StudiesFaculty of Advanced Science and TechnologyFaculty of SociologyFaculty of Policy StudiesFaculty of AgricultureFaculty of PsychologyGraduate School of LettersGraduate School of EconomicsGraduate School of Business AdministrationGraduate School of LawGraduate School of Policy ScienceGraduate School of International StudiesGraduate School of Science and TechnologyGraduate School of SociologyGraduate School of Practical Shin Buddhist StudiesGraduate School of Agriculture

Notable alumni 

 Yuji Fujii, a member of the House of Representatives in the Diet (national legislature)
 Ayano Tsuji, singer-songwriter.
 Takamaro Shigaraki, Buddhologist, later president of the university

See also
List of National Treasures of Japan (writings)

References

External links 
 
 Ryukoku Museum

Educational institutions established in 1922
Private universities and colleges in Japan
Universities and colleges in Kyoto
Buddhist universities and colleges in Japan
Important Cultural Properties of Japan
Kansai Collegiate American Football League
Giyōfū architecture
1922 establishments in Japan